Stuart Dickens is an English former professional rugby league footballer who played in the 1990s and 2000s. He spent almost his entire career playing for Featherstone Rovers (captain) (Heritage № 774), primarily as a goal-kicking . Dickens also played for Salford City Reds in the Super League after signing for them from Featherstone Rovers where he had been for 9-years. He played nine times that season, in which Salford were relegated, kicking four goals. He remained in this division ever since, opting not to try to regain first-grade action in Super League.

Playing career
Dickens made his début for Featherstone Rovers on Sunday 15 March 1998.

First Division Grand Final appearances
Dickens played right-, i.e. number 10, in Featherstone Rovers' 22-24 defeat by Wakefield Trinity in the 1998 First Division Grand Final at the McAlpine Stadium, Huddersfield on 26 September 1998.

Testimonial match
Stuart Dickens' benefit season/testimonial match at Featherstone Rovers took place during the 2007 season.

Coaching career
After retiring from playing in 2012, Dickens joined the coaching staff at Wakefield Trinity Wildcats.

Honoured at Featherstone Rovers
Stuart Dickens is a Featherstone Rovers Hall of Fame inductee.

References

External links
Profile at featherstonerovers.net

1980 births
Living people
English rugby league coaches
English rugby league players
Featherstone Rovers captains
Featherstone Rovers players
Rugby league players from Wakefield
Rugby league props
Salford Red Devils players